Qu Zimo (born 22 September 2001) is a Chinese wheelchair badminton player. He won two gold medals in para-badminton at the 2020 Summer Paralympics in men's singles WH1 and men's doubles WH1–WH2 respectively.

Personal life 
Qu was born in Shijiazhuang in Hebei, China. At three months old, Qu was diagnosed with polio and was paralyzed in his lower limbs. He was later drafted into the Hebei disabled badminton team where he began to learn and practice wheelchair badminton.

Achievements

Paralympic Games 
Men's singles

Men's doubles

World Championships 
Men's singles

Men's doubles

Asian Para Games 

Men's singles

Men's doubles

Mixed doubles

Asian Championships 
Men's singles

Asian Youth Para Games 
Men's singles

International Tournaments (11 titles) 
Men's singles

Men's doubles

Mixed doubles

References

External links
 

2001 births
Living people
Chinese para-badminton players
Paralympic badminton players of China
Paralympic gold medalists for China
Paralympic medalists in badminton
Badminton players at the 2020 Summer Paralympics
Medalists at the 2020 Summer Paralympics
People with paraplegia
Place of birth missing (living people)

Notes